Coyotas are empanada-like cookies that are large, flat, and traditionally filled with brown sugar. However, coyotas also come in a variety of flavors, including guava, caramel, chocolate, strawberry, jamoncillo (milk candy), peach, and pineapple.

Origins 

Spaniards introduced wheat, sugar, and goat's milk to Mexico around 500 years ago. They originated mainly in Villa de Seris, a city in Hermosillo, Sonora Mexico in 1954. They can now be found all over the world. In the US, they can be found in most Mexican supermarkets.

The meaning of the name "coyota" is a mestiza (of Spanish and native heritage) dark skinned and full of grace.

Ingredients 

 all purpose flour
 water
 salt
 shortening
 piloncillo (Mexican brown sugar made of molasses)

Preparation 

First, all the ingredients (see above) are mixed together. Next, Shortening and water are added to the mixture to thicken the consistency a bit. The dough is then made into small balls which are then filled to the consumers preference. They are then baked in the oven at 375 degrees F for about 15 minutes.

Coyotas tend to be accompanied with milk, coffee, hot chocolate, or tea. Sometimes even topped with whip cream.

See also
 List of Mexican dishes

References 

Mexican desserts
Cookies